The Balochistan Liberation Army (abbreviated BLA), also known as the Baloch Liberation Army, is a Baloch ethnonationalist militant organization based in Afghanistan. The BLA's first recorded activity was during the summer of 2000, after it claimed credit for a series of bombing attacks on Pakistani authorities. The BLA is listed as a terrorist organization by Pakistan, the United Kingdom and the United States.

Since 2004, the BLA has waged a violent armed struggle against Pakistan for what it claims as self-determination for the Baloch people and the separation of Balochistan from Pakistan. It has been involved in terror attacks against non-Baloch minorities in Balochistan. The BLA operates mainly in Balochistan, the largest province of Pakistan, where it carries out attacks against the Pakistan Armed Forces, civilians and foreign nationals. Although the BLA was officially founded in 2000, the media, and some analysts, speculate that the group is a resurgence of prior Baloch ethnonationalism insurgencies and, more specifically, the Independent Balochistan Movement of 1973 to 1977.

According to some sources, two former KGB agents code named 'Misha' and 'Sasha' were among the architects of the original BLA. According to the two KGB agents, the original BLA was built around the core of the Baloch Student Organization (BSO). The BLA disappeared following the withdrawal of the Soviet Union from Afghanistan as the USSR had been its main source of funding.

On 10 February 1973, Pakistani police and paramilitary raided the Iraqi embassy in Islamabad without the prior permission of the Iraqi government. During the raid, a large cache of small arms, ammunition, grenades, and other supplies were found in crates marked 'Foreign Ministry, Baghdad'; these were believed to be destined for Baloch rebels. Pakistan responded by expelling and declaring persona non grata the Iraqi Ambassador, Hikmat Sulaiman, and other consular staff. In a letter to President Nixon on 14 February, Bhutto blamed India and Afghanistan, besides Iraq and the Soviet Union, for involvement in a "conspiracy [...] [with] subversive and irredentist elements which seek to disrupt Pakistan's integrity"

David Wright-Neville wrote that besides Pakistan, some Western observers also believe India secretly funds the BLA. However, in August 2013, US Special Representative James Dobbins said, "The dominant infiltration of militants is from Pakistan into Afghanistan, but we recognize that there is some infiltration of hostile militants from the other direction. So Pakistan's concerns aren't groundless. They are simply, in our judgment, somewhat exaggerated."

Some have reported that Hyrbyair Marri has been the group's leader since 2007. Still, in an interview in 2015, he denied having any contact with the group. Hyrbyair's brother Balach had led the group from 2000 until he was killed in 2007.

Foreign involvement

India
The Indian newspaper The Hindu reported that BLA commanders had previously sought medical treatment in India's hospitals using disguises and fake identities. In one such case, a militant commander in charge of the city of Khuzdar was based in Delhi for at least six months in 2017 where he underwent extensive treatment for kidney-related ailments. Baloch militants' visits to India were often under assumed identities. Another Baloch Liberation Army commander, Aslam Baloch, was also alleged to have visited India. Previously, the Express Tribune had reported that Aslam Baloch was undergoing treatment at a hospital in New Delhi.

Pakistan has often accused the BLA of being an Indian proxy, alleging that Indian consulates in Kandahar and Jalalabad, Afghanistan, were providing arms, training, and financial aid to the BLA in an attempt to destabilize Pakistan. Baloch separatist Hyrbyair Marri denies the group has links with India. However, he has also claimed that he is not a BLA member. India has also denied helping the BLA.

Afghanistan
Afghanistan has acknowledged that they have been providing covert support to the Baloch Liberation Army. After the death of Aslam Baloch, alias Achu, in Kandahar, Afghan officials stated that the Afghan police chief Abdul Raziq Achakzai had housed Aslam Baloch and other separatists in Kandahar for years. Afghan news channel Tolonews reported that Aslam Baloch has been residing in Afghanistan since 2005.

Previously, the Baloch Liberation Army's leader Balach Marri was also killed in Afghanistan.

Terrorist designation
Pakistan designated the Balochistan Liberation Army as a terrorist organization on 7 April 2006 after the group conducted a series of attacks targeting security personnel. On 17 July 2006, the British government followed suit, listing the BLA as a "proscribed group" based on the Terrorism Act 2000. However, the U.K. has harbored Hyrbyair Marri, leader of the BLA, as a refugee, in spite of protest by Pakistan. The group's actions have been described as terrorism by the United States Department of State.

The United States designated the group as a global terrorist organization on 2 July 2019. The United States also froze assets belonging to the BLA. The European Union has also designated the Balochistan Liberation Army (BLA) as a terrorist organization. After BLA attacks on Chinese citizens, Chinese officials called on the Pakistani government to carry out additional strikes against the group.

Alleged violation of human rights
On 15 April 2009, Baloch activist Brahamdagh Khan Bugti—who has been accused by the Pakistani government of being a leader of the BLA—called for Balochis to kill non-Balochis residing in Balochistan, including civilians. Targeted attacks against Punjabi residents began soon after, with the BLA estimating 500 deaths. BLA leaders later claimed responsibility for inciting the attacks. Since the start of the insurgency, the BLA has targeted people from various ethnic backgrounds like Pashtuns, Sindhis, and Punjabis, whom the BLA considered outsiders in the province.

The BLA has been involved in attacks on schools, teachers, and students in the province.

Attacks

 On 14 December 2005, BLA militants launched six rockets at a paramilitary camp in Balochistan's Kohlu district that then-President Pervez Musharraf was visiting. Though Musharraf's life was never in any real danger, the Pakistani government labeled the attack an attempt on his life and initiated a sweeping army operation in Kohlu.
 On 14 June 2009, masked gunmen shot dead Anwar Baig, a school teacher in Kalat. Baig had opposed recitation of the Baloch anthem in schools. The killing was part of a larger campaign against educators who were seen to be sympathetic to the Pakistani state.
 On 30 July 2009, BLA militants kidnapped 19 Pakistani police in Sui, killed one and injured 16. Over the course of 3 weeks all but one of the kidnapped police were killed by their captors.
 In 2010, Nazima Talib, a female assistant professor at the University of Balochistan in Quetta was murdered. The BLA claimed responsibility for the attack.
 On 14 August 2010, BLA militants killed 6 laborers and wounded 3 others while they were on their way home from work.
 On 21 November 2011, BLA terrorists attacked government security personnel who were guarding a private coal mine in the northern Musakhel district, killing 14 and wounding 10 more. The BLA claimed to have killed 40.
 On 31 December 2011, BLA claimed responsibility for the suicide bombing targeting a Baloch politician, Naseer Mengal, at his home in Quetta. The suicide attack killed 13 people and injured 30 others.
 On 26 May 2012, Baloch Liberation Army took responsibility for assassination of Muzafar Hussain Jamali who was the principal of private school in Kharan. Jamali was travelling along with his family when they were attacked. Jamali and his eight year old nephew died on spot, while his two daughters were injured in the attack.
 On 12 July 2012, Baloch Liberation Army took responsibility for abducting and killing 7 coal miners and 1 doctor. The miners were abducted in Soorang area on 7 July 2012. The miners were later killed and their bullet ridden bodies were found. All of the victims were Pashtuns. Pakhtunkhwa Milli Awami Party (PkMAP) and coal miner labour union staged protest outside Balochistan High Court (BHC).
 On 6 August 2013, Baloch Liberation Army took responsibility for abducting and killing 11 passengers from a bus near Machh Town. The militants were disguised as security personnel.
 On 16 August 2013, Baloch Liberation Army claimed responsibility for conducting an attack on Jaffar Express near Machh. The attack claimed lives of two people and wounded ten others.

The Quaid-e-Azam Residency, a historical residence in Balochistan where Muhammad Ali Jinnah spent the last days of his life, was attacked by rockets on 15 June 2013. The building was nearly demolished as a result of the attack. Militants belonging to the Balochistan Liberation Army claimed responsibility. The militants also removed the flag of Pakistan from the monument site, replacing it with a BLA flag. The reconstruction work was completed and the rehabilitated Ziarat Residency opened on 14 August 2014 by then Prime Minister of Pakistan, Nawaz Sharif.
 On 3 November 2014, Baloch Liberation Army (BLA) attacked United Baloch army (UBA). Commander Ali Sher of UBA was killed in the attack. Four other members of the UBA were also captured by BLA.
 On 30 June 2015, Baloch Liberation Army (BLA) clashed with United Baloch Army (UBA) in Dera Bugti. The attack resulted in death of 20 militants on both sides.
 On 7 October 2016, Baloch Liberation Army claimed responsibility for twin blast targeting Jaffar Express. The attack claimed lives of six people and wounded eighteen other.
 10 Sindhi laborers were killed by two gunmen on motorbikes in 2017 Gwadar labors shooting, Pakistani officials stated on 13 May 2017. BLA claimed the attack as a response to the China–Pakistan Economic Corridor. Victims of the attack were native of Sindh province.
 On 14 August 2017, BLA claimed responsibility for a roadside bomb blast that killed 8 FC troops in Harnai.
 On 23 November 2018, BLA claimed responsibility for an attack, killing four, on the Chinese Consulate in Karachi in a tweet that included a photo of three men identified as Azal Khan Baloch, Razik Baloch and Rais Baloch. All of them were killed by police during the attack. Later on, the mastermind of the attack, Aslam Baloch Achu, was also killed along with five other commanders in Kandahar, Afghanistan.
 On 11 May 2019, the BLA claimed responsibility for an attack on the Zaver Pearl-Continental Hotel in the port city of Gwadar.
 On 29 June 2020, 4 militants of the BLA attempted to attack and hold the Pakistan Stock Exchange attack in Karachi as hostage but were swiftly killed by security forces.
On 15 October 2020, At least 14 security personnel were killed after a convoy of state-run Oil & Gas Development Company (OGDCL) was attacked on the coastal highway in Balochistan's Ormara, Radio Pakistan reported.
 On 27 December 2020, Seven soldiers were killed in an attack on a Frontier Corps (FC) Balochistan post in Harnai district of Balochistan.
 On 7 March 2021, two Navy Personnel were killed in an attack, when they were on their way to Ganz from Jiwani, Balochistan.
 On 24 March 2021, A Bomb blast left at least 3 people dead and another 13 were injured.
 On 28 May 2021, BLA accepted the responsibility of targeting a water supply vehicle of the Pakistan Army near a post at Nisau Dao Shah area of Kohlu with a landmine attack, which destroyed the vehicle completely & 4 personnel were killed.
 On 31 May 2021, 10 Frontier Corps soldiers were killed and 12 were injured in two attacks, one IED attack in Turbat and attack on a Checkpoint near Quetta. The attack was claimed by BLA.
On 9 June 2021, BLA accepted responsibility for the attack on the Pakistani army camp in the Karakdan area of Bolan Pass, in which two personnel were killed and two others were critically wounded.
On 14 June 2021, 4 Pakistani soldiers were killed in an IED attack. The attack happened at Marget Mines, about 75 kilometers (45 miles) east of Quetta, the capital of Balochistan.
 On 17 June 2021, Pakistan Army soldier was killed in a terrorist attack near Turbat airport, according to a statement from the Inter-Services Public Relations (ISPR).
 On 25 June 2021, Five soldiers from Frontier Corps, Balochistan, were killed after terrorists targeted a patrolling party in Sibi district's Sangan area. The five killed soldiers were identified as Havildar Zafar Ali Khan, Lance Naik Hidayatullah, Lance Naik Nasir Abbas, Lance Naik Basheer Ahmed and Sepoy Noorullah.
 On 1 July 2021, The explosion took place near a moving Frontier Corps (FC) vehicle, At least six people were injured in a blast on Quetta's Airport Road.
 On 15 July 2021, Two soldiers were killed in an IED blast during an operation against terrorists in Pasni, Balochistan. The two killed soldiers were identified as Captain named Affan Masood Khan and Sepoy Babar Zaman.
 On 20 August 2021, two children were killed and three were wounded in an attack targeting Chinese nationals in the port of Gwadar, Pakistan.
 On 26 September 2021, A statue of Pakistan's founder Mohammad Ali Jinnah has been destroyed by the Baloch militants in a bomb attack in the coastal city of Gwadar. The statue, which was installed in June at Marine Drive - considered a safe zone - was blown up by explosives placed beneath the statue on Sunday morning, Dawn reported on Monday.
 On 11 October 2021, Shahid Zehri 35-year-old Pakistani journalist was killed in an attack claimed to have been carried out by the banned Balochistan Liberation Army (BLA) in the country's restive Balochistan province.
 On 25–26 January, an attack on a security checkpoint in Kech Province led to the death of 10 Pakistani soldiers.
 On 2 February 2022, 9 militants and 12 soldiers were killed at Panjgur and Nushki districts of Pakistan's Balochistan province after forces responded to their attack. The Balochistan Liberation Army, claimed to have killed more than 100 soldiers at two military camps, claims rejected by Pakistan government.
On 2 March 2022, three people including a senior police officer in Quetta were killed after a roadside bomb explosion. BLA claimed responsibility of this incident.

On 26 April 2022, BLA claimed responsibility for a suicide bombing attack in which four people, including three of Chinese origin, were killed. It further said that this was the first such bombing by a female member of the group.

References

Baloch nationalist militant groups
Balochistan
Paramilitary organisations based in Pakistan
Separatism in Pakistan
National liberation armies
Organisations designated as terrorist by the United Kingdom
Organizations based in Asia designated as terrorist
Organizations designated as terrorist by the United States
Rebel groups in Pakistan
Rebel groups in Afghanistan
Organisations designated as terrorist by Pakistan
Research and Analysis Wing activities in Pakistan
Organisations designated as terrorist by the European Union
Organizations designated as terrorist by China